Greg Burke is the current director of athletics for Northwestern State University. He was hired in 1996 to replace long time Northwestern State athletic director Tynes Hildebrand.

References

External links
 NSUDemons.com bio

Living people
Northwestern State Demons and Lady Demons athletic directors
Place of birth missing (living people)
Year of birth missing (living people)